Hot press may mean:

Hot Press, a Dublin-based music and politics magazine founded in 1977 
regional name for an airing cupboard in Ireland and Scotland
hot pressing, any form of a machine press which uses heat – in particular:
sintering with pressure
Impressment during a time of national emergency